The index of physics articles is split into multiple pages due to its size.

To navigate by individual letter use the table of contents below.

0–9

1/N expansion
100 Authors Against Einstein
120° parhelion
1958 Lituya Bay megatsunami
1964 PRL symmetry breaking papers
1s Slater-type function
22° halo
23rd International Solvay Conference in Physics
331 model
3D ultrasound
46° halo
4GLS
4Pi Microscope
4Pi STED microscopy
4 pi laser
5 dimensional warped geometry theory
9-j symbol

Indexes of physics articles